Imasco Limited was a Canadian corporation headquartered in Montreal, Quebec, Canada.  It was founded in 1970 as Imperial and Associates, Co.

History
Imasco was the former owner of Imperial Tobacco Canada, Canada Trust, Shoppers Drug Mart, Genstar, and the Hardee's restaurant chain. The company sold Hardee's in 1997 to CKE, Canada Trust in 2000 to Toronto-Dominion Bank and Shopper's Drug Mart in 2000 to a consortium of institutional investors.  British American Tobacco, or BAT, had owned 41.5% of Imasco's shares. In 2000, British American Tobacco purchased the remaining 58.5% shares in Imasco and amalgamated the company with Imperial Tobacco Canada Limited.

Companies based in Montreal
Defunct companies of Quebec
1970 establishments in Quebec
2000 disestablishments in Quebec
Conglomerate companies disestablished in 2000
Conglomerate companies established in 1970
Canadian companies established in 1970
Defunct food and drink companies of Canada